The Blackout Pact is a post-hardcore band from Denver, Colorado. They formed in the early summer of 2003. The band is influenced by Hot Water Music, Small Brown Bike, Alkaline Trio, The Lawrence Arms, and Murder City Devils.

History
In October 2004, Geoff Rickly signed The Blackout Pact to the indie label Astro Magnetics. Rickly also produced their first CD Hello Sailor. They went on to tour with such bands as Fight Paris, Drowningman, The Lawrence Arms, The Fall of Troy, Folly, The Draft, Rise Against, The Number 12 Looks Like You, Yellowcard, Heavy Heavy Low Low, Silverstein, Mae and more. In 2005 they released a video to the song "We Drink So You Don't Have to."

December 2008, as reported newly on their Myspace site, The Blackout Pact have decided to come back from the hiatus and start recording again. Now with a new label: Eyeball Records. The band will start recording in January 2009, and the releasing date is expected to be on spring of the same year. The new EP will be called "Wolves In The Lazarette". This will be the second release material since the 2005 Hello Sailor album.

Former frontman Mike Herrera played guitar and shared vocals in a project called Sleeper Horse, which completed a mid-west tour and opened for The Draft, Gaslight Anthem and others before disbanding in 2007. Herrera then shared vocals and played banjo, mandolin and harmonica in the folk/punk outfit Tin Horn Prayer, which released their second LP, Grapple The Rails, via Paper + Plastick in October 2012. Their first album, Get Busy Dying, was released in 2010 on Bermuda Mohawk Productions. Herrera also played guitar in the math rock group, The Lonesome Death of Jordy Verrill.

On October 6, 2015, Herrera died in his sleep at the age of 33, seemingly ending any future plans for The Blackout Pact to continue.

Band members
 Mike Herrera - Vocals
 Cory Trendler - Guitar/Backing Vocals
 Joe Ramirez: Guitar
 Billy Joe Bailey - Bass/Backing Vocals
 Wisam Alshaibi - Drums
 Seth Piracci - Spiritual Advisor

Former members
 Ian Johnsen: Guitar/vocals
 Mike Delmonico: Guitar
 Justin Hackl: Guitar/vocals
 Nate Reisig

Discography

Albums

Singles
We Drink So You Don't Have To

References

External links
Official Myspace Site
The Blackout Pact on EyeBallRecords.com
The Blackout Pact on AstroMagnetics.com (former label)

American post-hardcore musical groups
Musical groups established in 2003